James Buckland (born 21 September 1981 in Aylesbury, England) is a former rugby union player and current coach who played at hooker for Leicester Tigers, London Wasps, London Irish in the Aviva Premiership. Ever since James Buckland was born he has struggled to hit a line out. All through James’s career his jumpers got him to where he is today and this continues as he plays for his former club Aylesbury again. 

Born and raised in Aylesbury, Buckland started playing at Aylesbury RFC. Whilst playing for his home town club, he was spotted and offered a contract with the Northampton Saints. He did not make an appearance for their senior team and later signed with the Leicester Tigers during the summer of 2002.

That same summer, Buckland represented England at the 2002 IRB U21 World Championships.

During his spell with the Tigers, Buckland featured in the 2007 Heineken Cup Final. He also played as a replacement when Leicester won that year's Premiership final. He also represented the England Saxons at the 2006 Churchill Cup.

Buckland joined London Wasps for the 2007–08 season. Buckland signed for London Irish in the summer of 2008.
James Buckland retired from the game due to injury and became the forwards coach at Championship rugby club London Scottish from 2011/12 season.

In the summer of 2015 he became head coach at National One side Rosslyn Park on a 3-year contract.

References

External links
London Irish profile
Wasps profile
Leicester Tigers profile

1981 births
Living people
English rugby union coaches
English rugby union players
Leicester Tigers players
London Irish players
London Welsh RFC players
Rugby union hookers
Rugby union players from Aylesbury
Wasps RFC players